Joyce Green may refer to:

People
Joyce Green (musician)
Joyce Hens Green, American judge

Places
Judson and Joyce Green Center for the Performing Arts
Joyce Green, Kent, near Dartford
Joyce Green Hospital, Joyce Green, Kent
Royal Flying Corps Station Joyce Green, a World War I airfield